46th Street Station may refer to:

46th Street (IND Queens Boulevard Line) in Queens, New York City
46th Street–Bliss Street (IRT Flushing Line) in Queens, New York City
46th Street (BMT Fifth Avenue Line), a demolished station in Brooklyn, New York City
46th Street station (Philadelphia), a SEPTA station in Philadelphia
Several METRO stations in Minneapolis, Minnesota
46th Street (Metro Transit station)
46th Street & Minnehaha station
46th Street & 46th Avenue station
I-35W & 46th Street station